David Leonardo Freytes Gasperi (Caracas, Venezuela, January 30, 1989)  is a Venezuelan film director, screenwriter, producer and actor.

Biography 
He is a journalist, graduated in 2011 that also attended a Master in Cinema and Television Direction in Barcelona (Spain) at Ramon Llul university (A.y.2011-2012). During the master course, he produced and directed two independent short films.

In 2011 before starting his university studies in filmmaking, David made his first experimental short film almost twelve-minutes long, called UNCONSTANT VARIABLE, realized with Gonzalo Castillo Torres. It's a psychological thriller with surrealistic atmosphere, acted by David Freytes (Guy).

In February 2012, while coursing his studies in cinema direction, he realized his six-minutes second piece titled The White Lady, a psychological thriller acted by Adrian Moure, David Freytes and Eulalia Barceló.

David's last short film, called Human Nature was realized in March 2012, the piece takes ten minutes and twenty-six seconds; it's a drama placed in Barcelona, Spain, acted by Adrian Moure (Jordi) and Samantha Senn (Laura).

Acted in the Venezuelan film The Psychiatrist as Osorio, a police detective. Was also first assistant director in the mentioned film.

Actually, David has written two screenplays for feature films: "Metastasis", a psychological terror history located in Barcelona-Spain, and Regression, a black comedy set in Venezuela.

Films 
 2014 - El Psiquiatra (Dir. Manuel Pífano) Osorio
 2012 - Naturaleza Humana (Dir. David Freytes)
 2012 - La Dama Blanca (Dir. David Freytes) Hombre misterioso
 2011 - Variable Inconstante (Dir. David Freytes) Guy

Soap opera 
 2009 - Libres Como el Viento (RCTV) Dionisio (Adolescente)
 2008 - Isa TKM (Nickelodeon) El Productor

References 

 David Freytes IMDB
 Manuel Pifano lleva al cine el caso de Edmundo Chirinos
 EL PSIQUIATRA
 Caso de Edmundo Chirinos salta al cine con "El Psiquiatra"
 Este 11 de julio se estrena "El Psiquiatra"
 El caso de Edmundo Chirinos llega al cine "El Psiquiatra" se estrena el 11 de julio
 "El Psiquiatra" se estrenará en el país el próximo 11 de julio
 El "Dr. Jekyll" venezolano llegará a la gran pantalla
 Película El Psiquiatra se estrenará el viernes 11 de julio
 Competencia FCV2014: El Psiquiatra
 Teaser de la película basada en el caso de "El Psiquiatra" Edmundo Chirinos

External links

1989 births
People from Caracas
Venezuelan male film actors
Living people